Giovanni Legnini (born 6 January 1959) is an Italian lawyer and politician, former vice president of the High Council of the Judiciary.

Biography 
Legnini graduated with a degree in law from the University of Teramo, and began his career as a lawyer in Chieti, Abruzzo.

From 1990 to 2002, Legnini was mayor of his hometown Roccamontepiano, supported by the Alliance of Progressives first and by The Olive Tree later.

In 2004, Legnini entered the Senate, taking over the seat of Ottaviano Del Turco who was elected to the European Parliament. Legnini was later re-confirmed to the Senate in 2006 and 2008 and was elected to the Chamber of Deputies in 2013.

After having been undersecretary in the Letta Cabinet and the Renzi Cabinet, Legnini was elected to the High Council of the Judiciary, and on 30 September 2014 was appointed vice president of the CSM.

References

External links 
Official website
Files about his parliamentary activities (in Italian): XIV, XV, XVI, XVII legislature.

1959 births
Living people
Democrats of the Left politicians
Democratic Party (Italy) politicians
20th-century Italian politicians
21st-century Italian politicians
University of Teramo alumni